The 2002 Toyota Grand Prix of Long Beach was the second round of the 2002 CART FedEx Champ Car World Series season, held on April 14, 2002, on the streets of Long Beach, California.  Michael Andretti won the race, his 42nd and final victory of his career as a driver in CART and IndyCar.

Qualifying results

Qualifying times in Italics show that that is the quickest time of that qualifying session.

Race

Caution flags

Lap leaders 

 New Race Lap Record Bruno Junqueira 1:08.981
 Average Speed 86.935 mph

External links
 Friday Qualifying Results
 Saturday Qualifying Results
 Race Results

Long Beach
Grand Prix of Long Beach
Toyota Grand